Dan Kronauge (born August 1, 1970) is an American former professional tennis player.

Kronauge, a native of Ohio, was an All-American tennis player for Ball State University, before competing on the professional tour in the 1990s. 

Specialising in doubles, Kronauge had a best world ranking of 175 and won one ATP Challenger title. His best performance on the ATP Tour was a round of 16 appearance in doubles at the 1995 RCA Championships.

Kronauge is a member of the Cincinnati Tennis Hall of Fame.

His nephew Justin is an associate head coach at Ohio State and a former player.

ATP Challenger finals

Doubles: 1 (1–0)

References

External links
 
 

1970 births
Living people
American male tennis players
Ball State Cardinals men's tennis players
Tennis people from Ohio